Dobiesław "Lubelczyk" Kurozwęcki of Clan Poraj, was a Polish nobleman, the Palatine of Lublin.

See also

Poraj coat of arms

Lublin Voivodes
Clan of Poraj